Sefid Choqa may refer to:
 Sefid Choqa, Kermanshah
 Sefid Choqa, Sahneh, Kermanshah Province